Roughton is a village and a civil parish in the English county of Norfolk. It straddles the A140 between Cromer and Norwich and the B1463.

The villages name means 'Rough farm/settlement', referring to the character of the ground.

The Village Today
Facilities in the village include a church, primary school, public house, village hall, fish and chip shop, play area, garage, windmill and fishing lake.

The Parish Church
Roughton church, St Mary's, is one of 124 existing round-tower churches in Norfolk. The tower is believed to be of Saxon origin and much of the main body of the building is Victorian.

The Einstein connection
  
In September 1933, Albert Einstein was brought to live in a small hut on Roughton Heath after fleeing Nazi Germany. Commander Oliver Locker-Lampson MP offered Einstein a refuge in Norfolk before he travelled to the United States. While here, he was sculpted by Jacob Epstein. A blue plaque commemorating Einstein's stay can be found at the entrance of the New Inn public house in the village. On 7 October 1933, he set sail from Southampton for a new life in the United States and never returned to Europe.

Einstein's visit inspired several works, including Mark Burgess’s radio play Einstein in Cromer, Philip Glass’s opera Einstein on the Beach, and a song of the same name by Counting Crows. The story behind Einstein's visit to Roughton has been told in a book - Saving Einstein. When Norfolk Hid a Genius. The Double Life of Oliver Locker-Lampson.

Disappearance of April Fabb
The schoolgirl April Fabb was cycling from Metton nearby to visit her sister in Roughton when she disappeared without trace on 8 April 1969.

Public transport
The nearest railway station is at Roughton Road for the Bittern Line, which runs between Sheringham, Cromer, and Norwich. The nearest airport is Norwich International Airport. Sanders provide a regular bus services to Norwich, Sheringham, Cromer, and Holt.

References

http://kepn.nottingham.ac.uk/map/place/Norfolk/Roughton

External links
St Mary's on the European Round Tower Churches website
 Sanders Bus service
 Norfolk Green bus service
Konectbus timetable
Roughton Chip Shop
The New Inn Roughton
BBC Norfolk

North Norfolk
Villages in Norfolk
Civil parishes in Norfolk